Santa Lucía del Camino is a city and its surrounding municipality located in the central part of the Mexican state of Oaxaca. It lies just 3 km east of the state capital city of Oaxaca, within the Oaxaca metropolitan area. 
It is part of the Centro District in the Valles Centrales region.

The city of Santa Lucía del Camino had a 2005 census population of 42,570 and serves as the municipal seat of the municipality of Santa Lucía del Camino, which has an area of 7.65 km² (2.95 sq mi) and a population of 45,752. The only other community in the small municipality is the town of San Francisco Tutla (population 3,182). The city is the seventh-largest community in the state of Oaxaca in population.

As municipal seat, Santa Lucia del Camino has governing jurisdiction over the village of San Francisco Tutla as well as itself.

References
Link to tables of population data from Census of 2005 INEGI: Instituto Nacional de Estadística, Geografía e Informática
Oaxaca Enciclopedia de los Municipios de México

External links
Santa Lucía del Camino Enciclopedia de los Municipios de México

Municipalities of Oaxaca